Bonnybridge High railway station was a railway station serving the village of Bonnybridge. The station was originally part of the Edinburgh and Glasgow Railway.

History
The station opened on 21 April 1842 as Bonnybridge, although there was a station of the same name on the nearby Caledonian Railway Main Line. This E&GR station was not renamed to Bonnybridge High until 1953, after the closure of the CR station in the 1930s. The station name reverted to its original in 1965 for the last two years of its existence.

References

Notes

Sources
 
 

Disused railway stations in Falkirk (council area)
Railway stations in Great Britain opened in 1842
Railway stations in Great Britain closed in 1967
Beeching closures in Scotland
Former North British Railway stations
1842 establishments in Scotland